Ketar is one of the administrative blocks of Garhwa district, Jharkhand state, India.

About Ketar
Ketar  a Taluka/Block, is located 61 km from Garhwa. Ketar is located near sone river.

Languages
Languages spoken here include Asuri, and Bhojpuri.

Facilities
Market:   A small market called as Ketar  bazar is situated in middle of the block.

See also
Garhwa district
Garhwa
Jharkhand

References

Garhwa district
Community development blocks in Jharkhand
Community development blocks in Garhwa district
Cities and towns in Garhwa district